Magyarországi Bőripari Munkások Szövetsége ('Leather Workers Union of Hungary') was a trade union of leather and skin industry workers in Hungary. The union was founded in 1903.

In 1940 Janós Katona became chairman of the union. In 1945, the union was replaced by the Magyar Bőripari Munkások Országos Szabad Szakszervezete ('Hungarian Leather Workers National Free Trade Union').

References

1903 establishments in Austria-Hungary
Trade unions in Hungary
Trade unions established in 1903
1945 disestablishments in Hungary